Meall Corranaich is a mountain with a height of  in the Grampian Mountains of Scotland. It lies on the northern shore of Loch Tay in Perthshire, and is part of the Ben Lawers group.

It is usually climbed from the northwest starting at Glen Lyon. The town of Aberfeldy lies to the east.

References

Mountains and hills of Perth and Kinross
Marilyns of Scotland
Munros
One-thousanders of Scotland